This is a list of holidays in Eswatini. If a holiday falls on a Sunday, it may be celebrated on the following Monday.

References 

Swazi culture
Eswatini
Eswatini